Clinical Rheumatology is a peer-reviewed medical journal covering rheumatology. It is published by Springer Science+Business Media on behalf of the International League of Associations of Rheumatology. The journal was established in 1945 as the official journal of the Belgian Rheumatology Society and carried different titles before obtaining its current title in 1982.

According to the Journal Citation Reports, the journal has a 2020 impact factor of 2.980.

References

External links

Rheumatology journals
Springer Science+Business Media academic journals
Publications established in 1945
Monthly journals
English-language journals
Academic journals associated with international learned and professional societies